Tehatta Sadananda Mahavidyalaya, established in 2013, is an undergraduate general and honours degree college in Tehatta in Purba Bardhaman district. It offers undergraduate courses in arts. It is affiliated to the University of Burdwan.

Departments

Arts
 Bengali
History
Philosophy
Sanskrit
Mathematics
Geography
Economics
Political Science
Education

See also

References

External links
 Tehatta Sadananda Mahavidyalaya

Colleges affiliated to University of Burdwan
Educational institutions established in 2013
Universities and colleges in Purba Bardhaman district
2013 establishments in West Bengal